The 5th Annual ASTRA Awards were presented on Monday 23 April 2007 at the Hordern Pavilion in Sydney.

Four new awards was added to the Marketing and Promotions category this year:
 Most Outstanding Creative Campaign
 Most Creative Off-air Promotion (For a Program, Series or Event)
 Most Outstanding Program Promotion Campaign
 Most Creative Use of Technology for a Consumer Application

Performers at the awards included Australian acts, Evermore, Sneaky Sound System, and Juke Kartel.

Marketing and Promotions
Most Outstanding Consumer Campaign – Subscription Sales
Winner:
The Sci Fi Channel Launch - Sci Fi Channel, Austar, Foxtel 
Nominated:
Reaching Mums with Kids and Twenty- Somethings - Austar
Foxtel 'Nothing' Campaign - Foxtel
Pricing and Packaging Campaign - Foxtel
The Sci Fi Channel Launch - Sci Fi Channel, Austar, Foxtel

Most Outstanding Consumer Campaign – Subscriber Retention
Winner:
Honeymoon Retention Campaign: Make the Most of Your Foxtel Digital – Foxtel
Nominated:
New Repackage Austar Digital - Austar
Honeymoon Retention Campaign: Make the Most of Your Foxtel Digital – Foxtel

Most Outstanding Creative Marketing Campaign
Winner:
UNKNOWN
Nominated:
Seven Deadly Sins - World Movies 
Foxtel iQ 'FREEZE' Campaign - Foxtel
Gotta Love Your League - Fox Sports
 
Most Outstanding use of Subscription Television Medium for a Consumer Advertising Campaign 
Winner:
Sony Dedicated Advertiser Location - Multi Channel Network/Starcom
Nominated:
Sony Dedicated Advertiser Location - Multi Channel Network/Starcom
Toyota Dedicated Advertiser Location - Multi Channel Network/The Media Store
SEEK Make Luck Happen Promotion - The Weather Channel

Most Creative On-Air Program Promotion
Winner:
Budgie Nation - MTV
Nominated:
Image Spot - FOX Classics
An Aussie Goes Barmy - FOX8
Budgie Nation - MTV
Project Runway - Arena
2006 French Open - Fox Sports

Most Creative Off-Air Program Promotion
Winner:
Rock Star: Supernova "It's Gonna Be Big" Campaign - FOX8
Nominated:
Great BBQ Challenge - LifeStyle Food
Rock Star: Supernova "It's Gonna Be Big" Campaign - FOX8
The Sci-Fi Channel Launch  - Sci Fi
Stupid Stupid Man - TV1

Most Outstanding Program Promotion Campaign 
Winner:
Entourage – Arena 
Nominated:
Rock Star: Supernova "It's Gonna Be Big" Campaign - FOX8
High School Musical - Disney Channel
Budgie Nation - MTV
Channel [V]: ARIA Awards - Channel [V]
Entourage – Arena

Most Creative Use of Technology (for a consumer application)
Winner:
High School Musical Dance Off – Disney Channel 
Nominated:
Eeeaster Frasier Interactive Marathon - TV1
High School Musical Dance Off - Disney Channel
Sky News: Anytime, Anywhere - Sky News
Supernova - UK.TV

Programming and Production

Talent
Favourite International Personality or Actor (public vote)
Winner
Paul Snr. and Paul Jnr. Teutul (American Chopper) – Discovery Channel

Favourite Male Personality (public vote)
Winner
Steve Irwin – Animal Planet

Favourite Female Personality (public vote)
Winner 
Antonia Kidman – W. Channel

Most Outstanding Performance by an Actor – Male
Winner
Dan Wyllie (Love My Way) – W. Channel

Most Outstanding Performance by an Actor – Female
Winner
Asher Keddie (Love My Way) – W. Channel

Most Outstanding Performance by a Presenter
Winner
David Speers (Agenda) – Sky News

Hall of Fame: Channel of The Year
Hall of Fame - Channel of The Year
Winner:
Nickelodeon
Nominated:
FOX 8
Sky News
Nickelodeon
Fox Sports

References

External links
 ASTRA Awards - Official Website
 ASTRA - Australian Subscription Television and Radio Association

ASTRA Awards
Astra Awards, 2007
Astra Awards, 2007